Sverre Halseth Nypan (born 19 December 2006) is a Norwegian footballer who plays for Norwegian club Rosenborg.

Club career

In January 2022 Nypan signed his first professional contract with Rosenborg. Just a few months later in April, Nypan signed a new contract and became a part of the first team squad.  

Nypan made his Rosenborg debut 6th November 2022 when he started in the league match against Jerv. In doing so he became the youngest player ever to represent Rosenborg at 15 years and 322 days, beating John Hou Sæter's record of being youngest in an official match and Magnus Holte's record as the youngest in a league match. And since he started the match he also beat Ola By Rise's record from 1977 as youngest to start a league match.

Career statistics

Club

References

External links
 

2006 births
Living people
Norwegian footballers
Association football midfielders
Rosenborg BK players
Eliteserien players